John G. Dreyfus (15 April 1918 – 29 December 2002) was a British book designer and historian of printing who worked for Cambridge University Press and the Monotype printing company. He was also president of the ATypI trade association. Into Print is an anthology of his collected writings.

Dreyfus was educated at Oundle School and Trinity College, Cambridge (BA 1939, MA 1945).

Dreyfus received the Gutenberg Prize of the City of Mainz in 1996.

References

1918 births
2002 deaths
People educated at Oundle School
Alumni of Trinity College, Cambridge
Historians of printing
20th-century English historians